The 1998 FIBA Africa Under-18 Championship for Women was the 5th FIBA Africa Under-18 Championship for Women, played under the rules of FIBA, the world governing body for basketball, and the FIBA Africa thereof. The tournament was hosted by Senegal from August 15 to 22, 1999.

Angola ended the double round-robin tournament with a 6–0 unbeaten record to win their first title.

Participating teams

Schedule

Final standings

Awards

See also
 2000 FIBA Africa Championship for Women

External links
Official Website

References

1998 in African basketball
Bask
FIBA Africa Under-18 Championship for Women
FIBA